Martine Époque (April 30, 1942 – January 18, 2018) was a French-born Canadian dance educator and choreographer living in Quebec.

She was recruited by the Université de Montréal to develop a dance course for the physical education program and came to Canada in 1967.

Époque founded the contemporary dance company Le Groupe Nouvelle Aire and served as its artistic director from 1968 to 1982. In 1999, she published a memoir Le Groupe Nouvelle Aire en Mémoires, 1968-1982. Choreographers and educators who grew out of that company included Édouard Lock, Louise Lecavalier, Ginette Laurin, Paul-André Fortier, Daniel Léveillé and Louise Bédard. She also started the company Danse Actuelle Martine Époque, which operated from 1981 to 1988.

She helped establish the dance program at the Université du Québec à Montréal and played an important role in the creation of the dance department in 1985 and the development of a master's program in dance in 1993. She helped establish the Agora de la danse, a creative space for contemporary dance in Montreal, and Passerelle 840, a laboratory ans showcase for experiments in choreography.

In 1994, she was awarded the Prix Denise-Pelletier.

Her short film Coda: the Finale for The Rite of Spring, co-directed with Denis Poulin, was presented at the 2014 Toronto International Film Festival.

References

External links 
 
 

1942 births
2018 deaths
Academic staff of the Université du Québec à Montréal
Canadian choreographers
Prix Denise-Pelletier winners
French emigrants to Quebec
Canadian women choreographers
People from Var (department)